Franchini is an Italian surname. Notable people with the surname include:

Gene E. Franchini (1935–2009), American lawyer and judge
Gianfranco Franchini (1938–2009), Italian architect
Irene Franchini (born 1981), Italian archer
Luca Franchini (born 1983), Italian footballer
Niccolò Franchini (1704–1783), Italian painter
Roberto Franchini (born 1973), Australian ice hockey player
Teresa Franchini (1877–1972), Italian actress

Italian-language surnames